Echinscus viridianus is a species of tardigrade in the family Echiniscidae. The species has been found in the United States (Alabama and New Mexico) and in the Azores Islands in the North Atlantic. It was first described by Giovanni Pilato, Paulo Fontoura and Oscar Lisi in 2007. The body length of Echiniscus viridianus lies between 175 and 310 µm.

References

viridianus
Invertebrates of the United States
Fauna of the Azores
Animals described in 2007
Taxa named by Paulo Fontoura
Taxa named by Giovanni Pilato
Taxa named by Oscar Lisi